Akoko Edo is a Local Government Area in Edo State, Nigeria. Its headquarters is in the town of Igarra. It has an area of 1,371 km and a population of 262,110 at the 2006 census.

The postal code of the area is 312.

As of 2016, its population density is 249.9/km [2016]

History 
Akoko Edo is a community that consist of different and distinct parts or groups, each one maintaining its individualized identity with historic pride and enduring posture.

It is said that the earliest settlers of Akoko Edo were the Benins, who would have been there the same period the Etsako people moved from Benin during the reign  (1483-1504). Other migrating people, due to the fortunes of time, came into the area from Nupe to make Benin city the spill-over of the Ekiti people known as Ado-Ekiti, moved into this area from the West. As a matter of fact, the whole of Ondo and Ekiti were once part of the former Benin Empire. It is little wonder that part of Akoko-Edo still forms a part of the Ekiti area today. From the Ebira and Igala from the North and East, the war which Oba Esigie fought in (1515-1516) with the Attah of Idah would have brought a lot of migration into the area.

The Akoko-Edo was formally classified with those referred to as Ivbiesakon which came under the general terminology Kukuruku. The Akoko-Edo comprises fourteen clans, namely: Atte, Akoko-Edo Central, Akoko-Edo East, Akoko-Edo North, Akoko-Edo North-East, Ikpeshi/Egbigele, Enwan, Igarra-Akuku, Kakumo-Anyanran, Okpe-Oloma, Okulosho, Ososo, Uneme-Central, Uneme North.

The ‘Akoko ‘has applied to the inhabitants of all these villages but no satisfactory explanation of its meaning and origin has been discovered. The most possible interpretation is that it is an onomatopoeia word “cork-e-doodle-do- and was applied by Ibadan raiders to the people they seldom say, but whose cock they heard crowing in their hiding places in the hills. The word ‘kukuruku’ has been similarly interpreted. According to the authors of Akuku the book title 'The Land' its Aborigionals Otaru J.A & Joseph S.I. They state that Akoko Edo literally means outskirt of Edo.
The first local government chairman is Chief Joshua.B.Mayaki.

Geography 
The Ancient Akoko-Edo area is situated in the northern part of Edo state in the south of the Niger-Benue Confluence. Its dominant geographical and environmental features are chains of ancient ridges of rugged rocky hills and a cave, stretching across the length and breadth of what is now known as the Akoko-Edo LGA of the present Northern Edo State, located between "latitudes 45 N  35 N and longitudes 55 E, 45 E". Akoko-Edo, with a population of about 124, 000 by the 1991 census, and 261, 567 by the 2006 National Population Census, occupies a land area of about 1, 371 square kilometers or 6.5% of Edoland and constitutes about 5.70% of Edo state population. The area is described as the ancestral homeland of all the sub-ethnic peoples who have been the speakers of the ancient language which is classified as Edoid. Akoko-Edo is bounded in the North by the present Kwara state and parts of the present Kogi state, in the north-west by the present Ondo state, in the south-east by both Etsako west (Auchiclans) and Etsako north (Okpella), and in the south-west by Owan.

Towns
The towns include Egbigere 1, Egbigere 2, Atte, Igarra, Enwan, Aiyegunle, Ugboshi-Afe, Ugboshi-Ele, Ekpesa, Ibillo, Ikiran-Ile, Ikiran oke, Ekor, Somorika, Lampese, Imoga, Ojah, Uneme-Akiosu, Ososo, Akuku, Ojirami-Dam, Imoga, Eshawa, Ojirami-Peteshi Ojirami-Afe, Dagbala, Makeke, Ekpe, Ekpedo, Bekuma, Okpe,  Ogbe, Onumu, Akpama, Anyonron, Ogugu, Ikakumo, Ijaja, Oloma, Okunese, Uneme-nekua, uneme erhurun and Ikpeshi.

Languages 
The people of Akoko Edo speak Eight (8) distinct languages but overlapping occurs. The Ojiramis (Group II) for instance, understand their neighbours Akuku (Group III) and Enwan (Group I), but not the people in the other village. Yoruba is understood by mainly the older generation. Pidgin English is the most widely spoken language in Akoko Edo.

References

Local Government Areas in Edo State
Local Government Areas in Yorubaland